Nicola Pecorini (born 10 August 1957) is an Italian cinematographer.

Pecorini was born in Milan, Lombardy, Italy. He founded, with Garrett Brown, inventor of the steadicam, the Steadicam Operators Association, Inc. (SOA), in 1988. Pecorini moved to the United States in 1993. Since 1997, he has frequently collaborated with critically acclaimed director Terry Gilliam (together they have made Fear and Loathing in Las Vegas, The Brothers Grimm, Tideland, The Imaginarium of Doctor Parnassus, The Zero Theorem and The Man Who Killed Don Quixote). In 2000, he won Best Cinematography at the San Sebastian International Film Festival for Harrison's Flowers. He is married to British actress Caroline Goodall and has two children, Gemma and Leone. He is blind in one eye.

Filmography
Film

Short films

Television

Music videos
"Oh Sailor", Fiona Apple (2005)
"Pourtant", Vanessa Paradis (2000)
"Riding With The King", B.B. King & Eric Clapton  (2000)
"Dark Moon", Chris Isaak (1994) (director)

References

External links
 Official website
 

Living people
1957 births
Italian cinematographers
Film people from Milan
Italian expatriates in England